Samsu Ch'ŏngnyŏn station is a railway station in P'osŏng-rodongjagu, Samsu County, Ryanggang Province, North Korea, on the Pukbunaeryuk Line of the Korean State Railway.

History

The station, originally called Samsu station, was opened on 27 November 1987 by the Korean State Railway, along with the rest of the first eastern section of the Pukbunaeryuk Line between Huju and Hyesan. It received its current name around 2013.

References

Railway stations in North Korea